To Be a Man: Stories is a collection of short stories by the American author Nicole Krauss and published in 2020 by HarperCollins (in the United States) and Bloomsbury Publishing (in the United Kingdom).

Publishers Weekly described it as  "a spectacular book" and said "Krauss’s style is marked by a willingness to digress into seemingly superfluous details, yet the minutiae helps the author conjure a series of realistic environments, allowing each story feel lived in". Cleveland Review of Books said the collection "will no doubt cement Krauss’s reputation as not only one of the prominent novelists of our time, but one of its most accomplished writers across forms."

Contents

The ten stories published in this collection appear in the following sequence:

”Switzerland”
”Zusya on the Roof”
”I Am Asleep but My Heart Is Awake”
”End Days” 
”Seeing Ershadi”
”Future Emergencies” 
”Amour”
”In the Garden”
”The Husband”
”To Be a Man”

See also

References

External links
 Nicole Krauss's official website

2020 in literature
2020 short story collections
American short story collections
Bloomsbury Publishing books
HarperCollins books
Novels by Nicole Krauss